The Apotheosis Square (Praça da Apoteose) is a venue in Rio de Janeiro close to the  Morro da Mineira favela. It is part of Sambadrome Marquês de Sapucaí, which can hold a maximum 90,000 people. For concerts, it can hold from 10,000 to 40,000 people.

It was designed by well-known architect Oscar Niemeyer in 1983.

In 1989, the band A-ha played 2 concerts with an attendance of 80.000 people each. 

On July 7, 2007 (07/07/07) the band Diante do Trono recorded their 10th album, called Príncipe da Paz (Prince of Peace). In the event, more than 100,000 people were gathered, packing the venue.

On March 14, 2010, a stage collapsed before a Guns N' Roses concert due to heavy rain and a small tornado. The concert was rescheduled to April 4.

Concerts
Since the 1970s, it has hosted famous artists' and band's presentations and concerts.
It also hosted  the Hollywood Rock festivals  and some other events.
In this chart there are some memorable concerts held at this square:

See also
List of Oscar Niemeyer works

References

Rio Carnival
Oscar Niemeyer buildings
Buildings and structures in Rio de Janeiro (city)
Tourist attractions in Rio de Janeiro (city)